White Box Requiem is the 25th album by Jandek, and his only for 1996. Released as Corwood Industries #0763, it is essentially a "concept album" (see the title) about a man who opens a "Pandora's box" of sorts. Over a year removed from the last album, this was the longest period between Jandek albums since the original three year stretch between the first two albums.

Track listing

References

External links 
Seth Tisue's White Box Requiem review

Jandek albums
Corwood Industries albums
1996 albums